Psenini is a tribe of aphid wasps in the family Crabronidae. There are about 11 genera and at least 460 described species in Psenini.
 In some recent phylogenetic analyses, this group together with the tribe Odontosphecini is considered to be the family Psenidae, treated as the sister lineage to the family Ammoplanidae and no longer included within Pemphredonidae, so as to keep families monophyletic.

Genera
These 11 genera belong to the tribe Psenini:
 Ammopsen Krombein, 1959 i c g
 Deinomimesa Perkins, 1899 i c g
 Lithium Finnamore, 1987 i c g
 Mimesa Shuckard, 1837 i c g b
 Mimumesa Malloch, 1933 i c g b
 Nesomimesa R. Perkins in R. Perkins and Forel, 1899 i c g
 Odontopsen Tsuneki, 1964 i c g
 Pluto Pate, 1937 i c g
 Psen Latreille, 1796 i c g b
 Pseneo Malloch, 1933 i c g b
 Psenulus Kohl, 1897 i c g b
Data sources: i = ITIS, c = Catalogue of Life, g = GBIF, b = Bugguide.net

References

Further reading

External links

 

Crabronidae